The Democratic Party (DP) was a political party of South Korea from 1995 to 1997. Formerly named United Democratic Party (DP), it was renamed in 1996.

History 
The party was formed by the merger of Democratic Party and New Reform Party. Originally, Democratic Party won the local elections in 1995. However, shortly after, Kim Dae-jung (DJ), former Co-President of the party, officially returned to politics, and conflicts were sparked. The party's pro-DJ factions, not excluding DJ himself, left and founded a new party, named National Congress for New Politics (NCNP). The remained Democratic Party merged itself with a minor party named New Reform Party, and newly formed United Democratic Party on 21 December.

The party faced a huge defeat in 1996 election, due to the oppositions votes splits under the FPTP systems with few PRs. On 4 June 1996, shortly after the election defeat, the party held a leadership election, and elected Lee Ki-taek, former President of the Democratic Party, as its Chairman, and also removed "united" from its name. The party was kept declining due to some MPs joining the ruling New Korea Party (NKP).

In the leadership election on 11 September 1997, Cho Soon was elected as the new Chairman, and also the presidential candidate for upcoming presidential election. Shortly before the leadership election, Cho was the 3rd-most preferred President, according to an opinion polls. However, his popularity kept declining till 4.7%, made him almost unable to manage his campaign. After 2 main opposition parties ― National Congress for New Politics (NCNP), and United Liberal Democrats (ULD) had agreed to put a sole candidate named Kim Dae-jung of NCNP, the ruling NKP's Lee Hoi-chang was struggling with his low popularity. Both NKP and Democratic Party agreed to merge each other and put Lee as their sole candidate. Both were combined and re-founded as Grand National Party, but dissidents including Roh Moo-hyun disagreed with it and joined to NCNP.

Party leadership

Chairmen

Election results

References 

Defunct political parties in South Korea
Democratic parties in South Korea
Political parties established in 1995
Political parties disestablished in 1997